Pigeon snaring was sport played exclusively by Tongan chiefs atop artificial mounds.  The appearance of these mounds began in the twelfth century but its popularity waned after centuries. By the 1700s, when Europeans began visiting Tonga and recording their observations, the sport was no longer played regularly. By the early 1800s, it was not played at all.

The sport
All that is known about the extinct sport is comes from one written eye-witness account, one engraving, oral tradition and archaeology.  William Mariner, an Englishman who lived in Tonga between 1806 and 1810 described:

"Jia Loobe [sia lupe], catching pigeons with a net.  This is not a very usual sport at present, though formerly it used to be.  The net used for the purpose is small, with a narrow opening, affixed to the end of a rod of about twelve feet in length.  The sportsman who holds it is concealed in a small cabin about five feet high, nearly in form of a bee-hive, in which there is a perpendicular slit dividing it quite in half, by which he can move his rod completely from side to side.  There are eight or nine of these cabins, in each of which perhaps, there is a sportsman with his net.  The only mode of entrance is by separating the two halves of the cabin from each other.  These receptacles are usually situated round the upper part of a raised mount.  On the outside of each there is a trained pigeon tied by the leg, and near at hand stands an attendant with another trained bird, tied in like manner to the end of a very long line, which is suffered to fly out to the whole extent of the string, the other end being held by the man.  The pigeon thus describes a considerable circle in the air round the mount beneath.  The flight of this bird, and the constant cooing of those below, attract a number of wild pigeons to the neighbourhood, when the man by checking the string calls in his pigeon, which immediately perches upon his finger.  He then conceals himself with the other attendants in a sort of alcove at the top of the mount.  The wild pigeons now approaching the tame ones, are caught in the nets by the dexterous management of the sportsmen."

A 1793 engraving by the French captain, D’Entrecasteaux corroborates Mariner's story.

The mounds

In Tongan, pigeon snaring mounds are called sia heu lupe.  The general shape of a pigeon snaring mound was described as “more or less circular platforms, 20-35 m wide and 0.6-5 m high, with a flat top. The characteristic feature of the Tongan pigeon mound is a circular central pit, 5—7 m in diameter, which has stone-faced walls. Some pigeon mounds in addition have large stone-lined pits filled with large boulders.  The function of these structures is unknown.” The central depression puzzles archaeologists because it is not described in William Mariner's account and no one knows how it was used to snare the pigeons. There are also many mounds, especially in Ha’apai, that do not have the depression.

While  can be found throughout Tonga, and even in American and West Samoa, the best studied are those in the Ha’apai Island Group, where many were constructed in the fifteenth and sixteenth centuries by the Mata’uvave line of chiefs. A 1990-1992 archaeological survey of northern Ha’apai by Simon Fraser University identified two on Nukunamo island, one on the northern tip of Foa Island, none on Lifuka Island, eight on U’oleva Island, one on Tatafa Island and none on ‘Uiha Island. One of these mounds, called Sialufotu on U’oleva island, is known as the personal mound the Mata’uvave and is the largest known  in Tonga.

The Simon Fraser study classified mounds into one of three types: mounds with central depression lacking stacked-stone retaining walls, complex mounds with stone retaining walls and access ramps, and flat-topped mounds. As pigeon mounds were created not only for the sport but to project status, the second type would exalt the highest status of the three as it required the highest investment of labour.

The Simon Fraser study also found several characteristics of pigeon mounds. "First, they were situated in areas without a large, if any, human population and this would have facilitated an expansive cover of forest growth to which pigeons would be attracted… Second, the mounds were constructed in protected areas that, while within the proximity to the shore, tended toward the center line of the island upon which they were built… this pattern conforms to the expected flight path of a migrating pigeon flock as it might be pursued by hunters."

The culture of pigeon snaring
Constructing pigeon snaring mounds required substantial investments of labour from many people, but the sport was tabu, or forbidden, to all but the Tongan chiefs.  Any pigeons captured by commoners were to be given to chiefs, and anyone caught eating a pigeon could be punished by "whipping or even death".

The sport could be played for rather basic, small mounds, so the variety in size ornamentation of the mounds is attributed to their projection of status for the chiefs who commissioned their construction. According to one historian, "pigeon mounds, together with the royal tombs (langi), can be considered as the highest ranking sites in Tonga."  The larger one's mound, the higher one's status.

References

Tongan culture
Hunting methods